Armando Fernándo Velásquez Escalante (born 18 September 1988) is a Venezuelan volleyball player. He competed in the 2020 Summer Olympics.

References

1988 births
Living people
Volleyball players at the 2020 Summer Olympics
Venezuelan men's volleyball players
Olympic volleyball players of Venezuela
People from Guárico